The South African Communist Party (SACP) is a communist party in South Africa. It was founded in 1921 as the Communist Party of South Africa (CPSA), tactically dissolved itself in 1950 in the face of being declared illegal by the governing National Party under the Suppression of Communism Act, 1950. The Communist Party was reconstituted underground and re-launched as the SACP in 1953, participating in the struggle to end the apartheid system. It is a member of the ruling Tripartite Alliance alongside the African National Congress and the Congress of South African Trade Unions (COSATU) and through this it influences the South African government. The party's Central Committee is the party's highest decision-making structure.

History 
The Communist Party of South Africa was founded in 1921 by the joining together of the International Socialist League and others under the leadership of Willam H. Andrews. It first came to prominence during the Rand Revolt, a strike by white miners in 1922. The large mining concerns, facing labour shortages and wage pressures, had announced their intention of engaging blacks in semi-skilled and some higher level jobs at low wage rates, compared to their white counterparts who enjoyed the monopoly of higher and well-paying occupations. The CPSA supported the strike as the struggle between the working class and the capitalist class but it distanced itself from racist slogans associated with the strike. The party said in the statement a white South Africa was impossible, and all the workers had to organise and unite regardless of their race to fight for a non-racial South Africa and better conditions for all workers.

In 1928, the Communist International adopted a resolution for the CPSA to adopt the "Native Republic" thesis which stipulated that South Africa is a country that belong to the natives, that is, the Indigenous Black population. The resolution was influenced by a delegation from South Africa. James la Guma, the party Chairperson from Cape Town, had met with the leadership of the Communist International. The party thus reoriented itself at its 1924 Party Congress towards organising black workers and "Africanising" the party. By 1928, 1,600 of the party's 1,750 members were black. Contemporary scholars have argued that the party dismissed competing attempts at multiracial revolutionary organisations during this period, especially multiracial union organising by the syndicalists, and used revisionist history to claim that the party and its Native Republic policy was the only viable route to African liberation. Despite this, in 1929 the party adopted a "strategic line" which held that, "The most direct line of advance to socialism runs through the mass struggle for majority rule". By 1948, the Communist Party had officially abandoned the Native Republic policy.

In 1946, the CPSA along with the African National Congress participated in the general strike that was started by the African Mine Workers' Strike in 1946. Many party members, such as Bram Fischer, were arrested.

Fight against Apartheid 

Aware that the National Party, elected to government in 1948, was about to ban the Communist Party, the CPSA decided by a majority to dissolve itself. A minority felt that the party should organise underground, but the majority apparently argued that this would be unnecessary, believing that support should be given to the African National Congress (ANC) in the drive to majority rule. After its voluntary dissolution, the CPSA was declared illegal in 1950. In 1953, a group of former CPSA members launched the South African Communist Party that remained — as had been the CPSA — aligned with the Soviet Union. The ban on the party was lifted in 1990 when the ANC and other anti-apartheid organisations and individuals were also unbanned, and African National Congress leader Nelson Mandela was released from prison.

The CPSA/SACP was a particular target of the governing National Party. The Suppression of Communism Act was used against all those dedicated to ending apartheid, but was obviously particularly targeted at the communists.

Following the dissolution and subsequent banning of the CPSA, former party members and, after 1953, members of the SACP adopted a policy of primarily working within the ANC in order to reorient that organisation's programme from a nationalist policy akin to the CPSA's former Native Republic policy towards a non-racial programme which declared that all ethnic groups residing in South Africa had equal rights to the country. While black members of the SACP were encouraged to join the ANC and seek leadership positions within that organisation, many of its white leading members formed the Congress of Democrats which in turn allied itself with the African National Congress and other "non-racial" congresses in the Congress Alliance on the basis of multi-racialism. The Congress Alliance committed itself to a democratic, non-racial South Africa where the "people shall govern" through the Freedom Charter. The Freedom Charter was adopted by the ANC, the SACP and other partners in the Alliance in accordance with its evolution. The Charter has since remained the cornerstone of the Alliance, as its basic, shared programme to advance a national democratic revolution, both a process of struggle and transformation to achieve a non-racial, non-sexist, democratic and prosperous South Africa.

The SACP played a role in the development of the Freedom Charter through its cadres who were openly active in the Congress Alliance and in the Party's underground organisation. In the same vein the Party played an important role in the evolution of the Alliance and the development of the liberation movement in South Africa.

As the National Party increased repression in response to increased black pressure and radicalism throughout the 1950s, the ANC, previously committed to non-violence, turned towards the question of force. A new generation of leaders, led by Nelson Mandela and Walter Sisulu recognised that the Nationalists were certain to ban the ANC and so make peaceful protest all but impossible.

They allied themselves with the communists to form Umkhonto we Sizwe ("Spear of the Nation") which began a campaign of terror by bombing civilian targets like shopping malls and restaurants. However the leaders of Umkhonto were soon arrested and jailed and the liberation movement was left weak and with an exiled leadership. Communist Joe Slovo was Chief of Staff of Umkhonto; his wife and fellow SACP cadre Ruth First was perhaps the leading theoretician of the revolutionary struggle the ANC were engaged in. The ANC itself, though, remained broadly social democratic in outlook.

In exile, communist nations provided the ANC with funding and firearms. Gradual work by the ANC slowly rebuilt the organisation inside South Africa, and the ANC was able to capitalise on the wave of anger amongst young South Africans during and after the Soweto uprising of 1976.

Eventually external pressures and internal ferment made even many strong supporters of apartheid recognise that change had to come and a long process of negotiations began which resulted, in 1994, in the defeat of the National Party after forty-six years of rule.

Post-apartheid 
With victory a number of communists occupied prominent positions on the ANC benches in parliament. Most prominently, Nelson Mandela appointed Joe Slovo as Minister for Housing. This period also brought new strains in the ANC-SACP alliance when the ANC's programme did not threaten the existence of capitalism in South Africa and was heavily reliant on foreign investment and tourism. However, the Freedom Charter had been considered only as a blueprint for a future democratic and free South Africa. Joe Slovo believed socialism had failed in Eastern Europe and could not be regarded as a model for the SACP. In his autobiography Long Walk to Freedom, Nelson Mandela famously remarked:
"The cynical have always suggested that the Communists were using us. But who is to say that we were not using them?"

After Mandela's death in 2013, the ANC confirmed that he had been a member of the SACP and served on its central committee.

Through the Tripartite Alliance and the sitting of many SACP members on the ANC's NEC, the SACP has wielded influence from within the ANC, often serving as an ideological opposition against the presidency and socio-economic policies of Thabo Mbeki (1999–2008); this became most apparent with the ouster of Mbeki from the presidencies of both the party (2007, by vote) and the government (2008, by ANC party recall) and his eventual replacement in both offices with Jacob Zuma, who was widely seen as being more conciliatory to the ideological demands of both the SACP and COSATU.

Initially, the party did not contest elections under its own name. However, in December 2017, the party contested a number of local council by-elections in Metsimahalo in the Free State, failing to win any first-past-the-post ward seats, but gaining three proportional representation seats. In total the SACP received 3,270 votes (6,3%).

General Secretaries 
1921: William H. Andrews
1925: Jimmy Shields
1929: Douglas Wolton
1929: Albert Nzula
1932: J. B. Marks
1933: Moses Kotane
1936: Edwin Thabo Mofutsanyana
1938: Moses Kotane
1978: Moses Mabhida
1984: Joe Slovo
1991: Chris Hani
1993: Charles Nqakula
1998: Blade Nzimande
2022: Solly Mapaila

National Chairperson 
1921: William H. Andrews
1925: Sydney Bunting
1931: Douglas Wolton
1933: Lazar Bach
1935: Issie Wolfson
1939: William H. Andrews
1953: Bram Fischer
2007: Gwede Mantashe
2022: Blade Nzimande

Prominent members of the Central Committee of the SACP 
 Jeremy Cronin
 Ruth First
 Bram Fischer
 Chris Hani
 Ronnie Kasrils
 Mazibuko Jara
 Mac Maharaj
 Nelson Mandela
 Govan Mbeki
 Thabo Mbeki
 Raymond Mhlaba
 Joe Slovo
 Yusuf Dadoo
 Jacob Zuma

Veterans' Category 
 Sydney Mufamadi
 Charles Nqakula
 Essop Pahad
 David Niddrie
 David Ivon Jones - founding member of the South African Communist Party

See also 
 List of communist parties
 African Communist
Central Committee of the South African Communist Party

Literature 
 Raising the Red Flag. The International Socialist League & the Communist Party of South Africa 1914 - 1932 by Sheridan Johns. Mayibuye History and Literature Series No. 49. Mayibuye Books. University of the Western Cape, Bellville. 1995. .
 Time Longer Than Rope by Edward Roux. The University of Wisconsin Press. Madison, Wisconsin. 1964. .

References

External links 

 South African Communist Party official site
 Fifty Fighting Years: The Communist Party of South Africa 1921-1971
 South African Communist Party Documents from Marxists Internet Archive.

 
Anti-Apartheid organisations
Political parties in South Africa
International Meeting of Communist and Workers Parties
Political parties based in Johannesburg